Batodonoides vanhouteni is an extinct shrew-like mammal, thought to be the smallest mammal that ever lived, as well as the smallest synapsid that ever lived. Based on the size of its molar teeth, it is estimated that Batodonoides vanhouteni weighed only  (with  most likely). They lived about 53 million years ago during the early Eocene Epoch in North America. The species is a member of the Order Eulipotyphla.

The fossilized remains of a juvenile, consisting of a mandible and some teeth, were discovered in 1998 in Wyoming in 53-million-year-old rocks. Another member of the genus is known from California, also from the Early Eocene.

See also
 Smallest organisms

References

External links
Teeth of B. vanhouteni from the University of California Museum of Paleontology

Prehistoric Eulipotyphla
Fossil taxa described in 1998
Prehistoric mammals of North America
Eocene mammals